Dominic Loricatus, O.S.B. Cam. (Italian: San Domenico Loricato; 995 - 1060), was an Italian monk, born in the village of Luceolis near Cantiano (then in Umbria, now in the Marche). His father, seeking social advancement, paid a bribe to have him ordained a priest when still a child. When he discovered the fact, he resolved on a life of penance and became a hermit in the woods near the abbey of S. Emiliano in Congiuntoli, then a Camaldolese monk at the monastery of Fonte Avellana in 1040.

Fonte Avellana was at this time under the influence of St. Peter Damian, who promoted penitential self-mortification. It is through his vigorous embrace of this practice that Dominic Loricatus has become most well known, particularly through a mention by Edward Gibbon in The History of the Decline and Fall of the Roman Empire (Vol. V, C. LVIII):

"By a fantastic arithmetic, a year of penance was taxed at three thousand lashes; and such was the skill and patience of a famous hermit, Saint Dominic of the iron Cuirass, that in six days he could discharge an entire century, by a whipping of three hundred thousand stripes. His example was followed by many penitents of both sexes; and, as a vicarious sacrifice was accepted, a sturdy disciplinarian might expiate on his own back the sins of his benefactors."

Dominic is said to have performed these lashes while reciting the psalms, with 100 lashes for each psalm. 30 psalms (3000 strokes) made penance for one year of sin; the entire psalter redeemed 5 years, while 20 psalters (300,000 strokes) redeemed one hundred years - hence the  'One Hundred Years Penance' St. Dominic is said to have performed in six days, over Lent.

In calculating these lashes one is left with these numbers: 50,000 lashes per day. Assuming Dominic was awake for 20 hours a day, that gives 2,500 lashes per hour, which would result in 41 lashes per minute.

Dominic owes his nickname Loricatus to his further bodily mortification of wearing a coat of chain mail (Latin: Lorica hamata) next to his skin as a hairshirt. He died at the Hermitage of San Vicino, near San Severino Marche in 1060, where he had been appointed prior by Peter Damian the previous year,  where his remains are still venerated. His feast is celebrated by the Camaldolese Order on October 14.

References
 Peter Damian, Vita Sancti Dominici Loricati (Life of St. Dominic Loricatus), in Jacques Paul Migne, Patrologia Latina, CXLIV
 Edward Gibbon, The History of the Decline and Fall of the Roman Empire Vol. V, chapter LVIII
 William M. Cooper, Flagellation and the Flagellants: A History of the Rod
 Norman Cohn, The Pursuit of the Millennium
 Giles Constable, Culture and Spirituality in Medieval Europe

995 births
1060 deaths
People from the Province of Pesaro and Urbino
11th-century Italian Roman Catholic priests
Italian hermits
Italian Benedictines
Camaldolese Order
Burials in le Marche
Italian Roman Catholic saints
Camaldolese saints
11th-century Christian saints